Rečani (officially: Речани - Зајаско, Rechani - Zajasko) is a village in the municipality of Kičevo, North Macedonia. It used to be part of the former Zajas Municipality.

Demographics
As of the 2021 census, Rečani had 48 residents with the following ethnic composition:
Albanians 46
Turks 1
Persons for whom data are taken from administrative sources 1

According to the 2002 census, the village had a total of 101 inhabitants. Ethnic groups in the village include:
Albanians 100
Others 1

References

External links

Villages in Kičevo Municipality
Albanian communities in North Macedonia